Haemamoeba is a subgenus of the genus Plasmodium — all of which are parasites. The subgenus was created in 1963 by created by Corradetti et al.. Species in this subgenus infect birds.


Diagnostic features 

Species in the subgenus Haemamoeba have the following characteristics:

Mature schizonts are larger than the host cell nucleus and commonly displace it.

Gametocytes are large, round, oval or irregular in shape and are substantially larger than the host nucleus.

Species in this subgenus 
 Plasmodium cathemerium
 Plasmodium coggeshalli
 Plasmodium elongatum
 Plasmodium gallinaceum
 Plasmodium giovannolai
 Plasmodium griffithsi
 Plasmodium lutzi
 Plasmodium matutinum
 Plasmodium parvulum
 Plasmodium relictum
 Plasmodium tejerai

References 

Plasmodium subgenera
Parasites of birds